Listed below are notable people who are either citizens of Bangladesh, born in the region of what is now Bangladesh, or of Bangladeshi origin living abroad. For brevity, people who fall into more than one category are listed in only one of them. For further information, see Bangladeshi people.

Leaders of independence movements

British colonial period 

 Khwaja Salimullah, founder of the All-India Muslim League, contributed to the spread of Muslim nationalism in South Asia
 Chittaranjan Das, founder of the Swaraj Party, one of the leading proponents of intercommunal harmony in India
 Nawaab Syed Shamsul Huda, first Indian Muslim president of the reformed legislative council of the undivided Bengal in 1921
 A. K. Fazlul Huq, Prime Minister of Bengal (1937–1943), Chief Minister of East Bengal (1954–1955) and Governor of East Pakistan (1956)
 Nawab Abdul Latif, educator and social worker
 Surya Sen, revolutionary and leader of Indian independence movement, known for leading Chittagong armoury raid
 Haji Shariatullah, founder of the Faraizi Movement
 Huseyn Shaheed Suhrawardy, last Prime Minister of Bengal (1946–1947), later Prime Minister of Pakistan (1956–1957)
 Pritilata Waddedar, activist of the Indian independence movement

Martyrs of the Bengali Language Movement 1952

 Rafiq Uddin Ahmed
 Abul Barkat
 Abdul Jabbar
 Abdus Salam
 Shafiur Rahman

Bangladesh War of Independence, 1971

 Tajuddin Ahmed, first Prime Minister of Bangladesh, War of Independence
 Sheikh Mujibur Rahman, Bangabandhu (Friend of Bengali)
 Abdul Hamid Khan Bhashani
Chitta Ranjan Dutta, Sector Commander 4
 Major Nazmul Huq, Commander Sector 7 (till August 1971)
 Squadron Leader M. Hamidullah Khan, Bangladesh Government Chief Representative - Chakulia (Bihar) Guerilla Trng. Camp, BDF Sub-sector commander - Mankarchar (Sector 11), BDF Commander - Sector 11 (November 2–February 14, 1972)
 Major M.A. Manzur, Commander Sector 8
 Major Khaled Musharraf, BDF Commander Sector 2, Commander K-Force
 Colonel-in-Chief Muhammad Ataul Ghani Osmany, Commander-in-Chief, Bangladesh Forces, War of Independence, 1971. (Later promoted to General)
 Major Ziaur Rahman, Declarer (on behalf of Sheikh Mujib) of the Independence of Bangladesh on March 27, 1971. BDF Sector Commander Sector 1(April~May) and Central Sector - Sector 11 (June – October 10, 1971) and Z-Force Commander
 Major K.M Shafiullah, S Force Commander
 Major Abu Taher, sub-sector commander - Mahendraganj (HQ 11), Interim Commander Sector 11 (October 10–November 2, 1971)

Scientists, engineers and educators 

 Nasima Akhter (born 1970), nuclear medicine researcher
 Arun Kumar Basak, scientist and Professor Emeritus of University of Rajshahi
 Abdullah Al Muti, scientist and science writer
 Maqsudul Alam, scientist and professor who achieved three milestones in genomics - sequencing the genomes of papaya, rubber plants and jute at University of Hawaii
 Mir Masoom Ali, emeritus professor of statistics
 Amit Chakma, tenth president of the University of Western Ontario
 Abed Chaudhury, scientist living in Australia, born in Moulavibazar; renowned for getting the Bangladeshi rice variety kasalath recognized by IRRI; the variety was first claimed to be of Indian origin
 SM Faruque, microbiologist and scientist, researcher on Vibrio cholerae which causes Cholera
 Azizul Haque, who pioneered the mathematical formula for the Henry Classification System of fingerprinting
Tanzima Hashem, academic, Elsevier Foundation Award winner in 2017
 M. Zahid Hasan, Eugene Higgins endowed chair professor of quantum physics at Princeton University and scientist at Lawrence Berkeley National Laboratory; known for many ground-breaking discoveries in the quantum world 
 Khandkar Manwar Hossain, statistician and founder of the Department of Statistics in Rajshahi University
 Saleemul Huq, awarded the Burtoni Award for contributing to climate change adaptation
 Fazle Hussain, professor of Mechanical Engineering at Texas Tech University; elected Fellow of National Academy of Engineering
 Abul Hussam, awarded the 2007 Grainger Challenge Prize for Sustainability
 Muhammed Zafar Iqbal, scientist and science writer
 Jamal Nazrul Islam, physicist and mathematician
 Jawed Karim, co-creator of YouTube and designer of PayPal's anti-fraud system
 Mohammad Ataul Karim, Bangladeshi American scientist
 Fazlur Rahman Khan, structural engineer and architect
 Bibhuti Roy, engineer and educationist
 Salman Khan, founder of Khan Academy
 M. A. Naser, pioneer in engineering education in Bangladesh
 Muhammad Qudrat-i-Khuda, Bangladeshi scientist, educationist and writer
 Khondkar Siddique-e-Rabbani, biomedical physicist
 Abdul Matin Patwari, electrical engineer, mathematician, vice-chancellor of Bangladesh University of Engineering Technology
 Qazi Motahar Hossain, scientist, statistician, founder-director of Institute of Statistical Research and Training, University of Dhaka
 Omar Ishrak, investor, entrepreneur, executive chairman and chairman of the board, Medtronic; board chairman of INTEL
 Mohammad Kaykobad, computer scientist, educator, author and columnist of Bangladesh, professor of computer science and engineering at BUET
 Towfique Raj, neurogeneticist, Professor of Neuroscience and Genomics at Icahn School of Medicine at Mount Sinai; Gates Cambridge Scholar 
 Lucina Uddin, American neuroscientist, born in Bangladesh

Educationists 

 Serajul Islam Choudhury, educationist, public intellectual
 Rasheda K Chowdhury, Bangladeshi academic, former Advisor of Caretaker Government, Bangladesh
 Abul Kashem Fazlul Haq, educationist, former professor of University of Dhaka
 Syed Manzoorul Islam, educationist, former professor of University of Dhaka
 Rafiqul Islam, national professor, Bangladesh
 Jamilur Reza Choudhury, former professor, BUET, national professor, Bangladesh
 Anisuzzaman, professor, University of Dhaka, national professor, Bangladesh

Arts, culture, and literature

 Hiralal Sen, founder of Indian cinema
 Ahmed Sofa, writer, thinker, novelist
 Zainul Abedin, painter
 Humayun Ahmed, novelist and former professor of Chemistry, Dhaka University
 Tofail Ahmed, author and researcher of folk art
 Shahidul Alam, photographer
 Alaol, medieval poet
 Monica Ali, author of Brick Lane
 Syed Mujtaba Ali, Bengali author, academician, scholar and linguist
 Tahmima Anam, novelist and winner of the 2008 Commonwealth Writers' Prize
 Rashid Askari, writer, fictionist, columnist, and academic
 Humayun Azad, writer and former professor of Bengali, Dhaka University
 Rafiq Azad, poet
 Manzoor Alam Beg, photographer and author
 Munier Chowdhury, educator, dramatist and intellectual killed in 1971 Liberation War of Bangladesh
 Akhteruzzaman Elias, novelist and short story writer
 Nirmalendu Goon, poet
 Abdul Hakim, medieval poet
 Marjana Chowdhury, Bangladeshi-American model, philanthropist and beauty queen Miss Bangladesh USA
 Sikdar Aminul Haq, poet
 Quamrul Hassan, artist
 Saad Z Hossain, writer
 Khondakar Ashraf Hossain, poet, essayist, translator and editor
 Abul Hussain, poet
 Jahanara Imam, writer and activist
 Muhammed Zafar Iqbal, writer and educator
 Kazi Nazrul Islam, national poet of Bangladesh
 Mazharul Islam, architect, political activist
 Syed Jahangir, freelance artist of Bangladesh
 Adiba Jaigirdar, Bangladeshi-Irish writer
 Jasimuddin, poet
 Shahriyar Kabir, author and journalist
 Shahidullah Kaiser, educator, novelist and intellectual killed in 1971 Liberation War of Bangladesh
 Abul Kashem, architect and educationist
 Lalon Shah, mystic poet
 Al Mahmud, poet
 Firoz Mahmud, contemporary visual artist, creator, painter
Ghulam Murshid, author, scholar and journalist
 Partha Pratim Majumder, Bangladeshi mime artist who is considered the "forerunner" of mime art in Bangladesh
 Natyaguru Nurul Momen, trailblazer progressive cultural personality who dispelled fundamentalism from the society by championing theatrical and performing arts and secular literature
 Shahabuddin Nagari, poet, writer and singer
 Shamsur Rahman, poet
 Hason Raja, mystic poet
 Begum Rokeya, writer
 Bibi Russell, model and fashion designer
 Arunabh Sarkar, poet
 Muhammad Shahidullah, Bengali educationist, writer and linguist
 Rudra Muhammad Shahidullah, poet
 Ahmed Sharif, writer of Bengali literature, secularist
 SM Sultan, painter
 Kamal Chowdhury, poet
 Taslima Nasrin, famous writer and feminist, awardee of Ananda Puraskar
 Salimullah Khan, writer, thinker
 Hasan Azizul Haq, writer
 Sanjida Khatun, musicologist, one of the founders of Chhayanaut
 Shahid Mahmud Jangi, writer, lyricist
 Monica Jahan Bose, artist and climate activist

Chefs 

 Afroza Naznin Shumi

 Keka Ferdousi

 Alpana Habib

 Tony Karim

 Siddika Kabir

Social reformers and leaders

 Fazle Hasan Abed,  founder of BRAC
 Hazi Mohammad Mohsin, philanthropist
 Muhammad Yunus, founder of the Grameen Bank, 2006 Nobel Peace Prize winner

Music, film and television

 Ayub Bachchu, singer and guitarist
 Abdur Razzak, actor, director
 Shabana, film actress
 Bobita, film actress
 Shefali Chowdhury, played Harry Potter's Yule Ball date in Goblet of Fire
 Sumita Devi, film and television actress
 Farzana Dua Elahe, British actress and DJ
 Abdul "Duke" Fakir, American singer of Ethiopian and Bangladeshi descent, member of the Four Tops
 Humayun Faridi, TV, stage, and film actor
 Chanchal Chowdhury, actor
 Bidya Sinha Saha Mim, actor and model
 Apu Biswas, film actress and model
 Jaya Ahsan, actress and producer 
 Dipjol, film actor, film producer and politician
 Waheedul Haq, Tagore song specialist and journalist
 Zahid Hasan, actor and director
 Rahsaan Islam, American actor of Bangladeshi descent
 Jayasree Kabir, actress
 Kaushik Hossain Taposh, music composer, singer, producer & MD of Gaan Bangla
 Mehazabien Chowdhury
 Mosharraf Karim, actor
 Montazur Rahman Akbar, film director, producer
 Mukul Chowdhury, lyricist and musical artist
 Azam Khan, singer
 Alam Khan, music director and composer 
 Tahsan Rahman Khan, singer and actor
 Shakib Khan, actor, producer, singer, film organiser and media personality
 Arifin Shuvoo, actor, television presenter, RJ and model
 Runa Laila, singer
 Manna, film actor
 Tareque Masud, film director
 Tanvir Mokammel, film director
 Asaduzzaman Noor, actor, politician and member of parliament
 Khan Ataur Rahman, film director
 Shahnaz Rahmatullah, singer
 Raja Chanda
 Rola, half Bangladeshi, quarter Russian, quarter Japanese fashion model
 Shabnam, film actress
 Dino Shafeek, British actor known for Mind Your Language
 Sadia Khalid Reeti, film critic
 Salman Shah, film actor
 Sabina Yasmin, singer
 Zahir Raihan, film director
 Sharmin Sultana Sumi, singer 
 Emon Chowdhury, singer

Economists
 Muhiuddin Khan Alamgir, internationally recognised economist, elected member of IMF (International Monetary Fund), National political leader

 Qazi Kholiquzzaman Ahmad, economist and development thinker, Chairman of Dhaka School of Economics
Nurul Islam, economist, Deputy Chairman of the  Planning Commission, author
 Muzaffar Ahmed, economist and emeritus professor at the Institute of Business Administration of the University of Dhaka
 Atiur Rahman, economist, Governor of Bangladesh Bank and former director of the state-owned Sonali Bank
 Rehman Sobhan, economist

Entrepreneurs

 Abdul Awal Mintoo, former president of Federation of Bangladesh Chambers of Commerce and Industry (FBCCI)
 Amjad Khan Chowdhury, founder of Bangladesh business conglomerate PRAN-RFL Group
 Ahmed Akbar Sobhan, chairman of the business conglomerate Bashundhara Group
 Ananta Jalil, chairman of AJ Group (Bangladesh)
 Ayman Sadiq, founder of 10 Minutes School
 Sir Fazle Hasan Abed, founder and chairperson of the world's largest international development NGO, BRAC
 Samson H. Chowdhury, chairman of Astras Ltd. and Square (Bangladesh)
 Syed Manzur Elahi, founder of Apex Group
 Iqbal Quadir, co-founder of GrameenPhone
 Jawed Karim, co-founder of YouTube
 Mahmudur Rahman, newspaper owner and editor
 Mohammad Fazlul Azim, chairman of Azim Group, former MP
 Omar Ishrak, investor, entrepreneur, executive chairman and chairman of the board, Medtronic; board chairman of INTEL

Media and journalism

 Mukhlesur Rahman Chowdhury, former adviser to the President of Bangladesh
 Salah Choudhury, writer, peace activist and journalist
 Lenin Gani, journalist, winner of the Best Sports Report in 2001 by Dhaka Reporters Unity
 Kaberi Gayen, prominent academic, author, columnist for The Daily Star
 Kazi Shamsul Hoque, journalist
 Mainul Hosein, former chairman of the editorial board of The Daily Ittefaq
 Naveed Mahbub, comedian and columnist
 Matiur Rahman, editor of the daily Prothom Alo, winner of Ramon Magsaysay Award for journalism
 Shykh Seraj, director of News Channel i, Agriculture Development activist, winner of FAO A.H. Boerma Award, Ekushey Padak
 Mahbub Jamal Zahedi, former editor of the Khaleej Times, assistant editor of Dawn, and founder-editor of The Agatya
 Samia Zaman, Editor and CEO of the television channel Ekattor TV
 Tasmima Hossain, on 4 July 2018, she was made the editor of The Daily Ittefaq
 Anisul Hoque, associate editor of a Bengali-language daily Prothom Alo and the editor of monthly youth magazine Kishor Alo
 Naem Nizam, Editor Bangladesh Pratidin
 Farida Yasmin, President of Jatiya Press Club
 Khaled Muhiuddin, head of the German-based international media, Deutsche Welle Bangla Department

Political figures

 Manoranjan Dhar, former law minister, BD
 Anwara Khatun, member of East Pakistan Legislative Assembly
 Muhiuddin Khan Alamgir, adviser, Bangladesh Awami League, former Home Minister
 M Saifur Rahman, former finance minister
 Shah M S Kibria, former finance minister
 Abdus Samad Azad, former Foreign Minister
 Dewan Farid Gazi, former minister
 Abul Mal Abdul Muhit, incumbent finance minister
 Nurul Islam Nahid, incumbent education minister
 Abul Mansur Ahmed, politician from Mymensingh
 Moudud Ahmed, barrister, politician and statesman
 Oli Ahmed (Bir Bikram), President of the Liberal Democratic Party (Bangladesh), 2006–present; former Minister (various portfolios in multiple cabinets); decorated freedom fighter; one of the main founders of Bangladesh Nationalist Party (BNP)
 Shahabuddin Ahmed, former president
 Tajuddin Ahmed, first Prime Minister of Bangladesh
 Majid-ul-Haq, minister 
 Ghulam Azam, Islamist politician, former leader of Jamaat-e-Islami Bangladesh, accused of war crimes for his role in 1971 Bangladesh Liberation War
 Maulana Abdul Hamid Khan Bhashani, founder of Bangladesh Awami League, National Awami Party
 Muhammad Ali Bogra, Prime Minister of Pakistan, 1953–1955
 Fazlul Qadir Chaudhry, acting President of Pakistan, Speaker of the National Assembly of Pakistan, President of Muslim League, accused of war crimes for his role in 1971 Bangladesh Liberation War
 Hamidul Huq Choudhury, Foreign Minister of Pakistan, 1954–1956
 A.B.M. Mohiuddin Chowdhury, mayor of Chittagong, member of the Chowdhury Family
 A.Q.M. Badruddoza Chowdhury, former president, Leader of Bikalpa Dhara
 Motiya Chowdhury, member of Parliament, former Minister of Agriculture
 Saber Hossain Chowdhury, member of Parliament
 Salauddin Quader Chowdhury, former Minister, accused of war crimes for his role in 1971 Bangladesh Liberation War, son of Fazlul Qadir Chaudhry
 Hussain Mohammed Ershad, CMLA and later President from 1982 to 1991; Leader of Jatiya Party
 Mirza Ghulam Hafiz, politician and minister
 Sheikh Hasina, Prime Minister, 1996–2001, 2009–present
 Khorshed Ara Haque, Member of Parliament
 A. K. Fazlul Huq, Chief Minister of East Bengal, Governor of East Pakistan
 Altaf Husain, Minister of Commerce and Industry of Pakistan, 1965–1968
 Abdul Jolil, politician and Minister
 Morshed Khan, former Foreign Minister
 Khawaja Nazimuddin, second Governor-General of Pakistan, and the second Prime Minister of Pakistan
 Shah Azizur Rahman, former Prime Minister of Bangladesh
 Sheikh Mujibur Rahman, former Prime Minister of Bangladesh
 Tareq Rahman, senior vice president of Bangladesh Nationalist Party (BNP), son of Begum Khaleda Zia and Ziaur Rahman
 Abdur Razzaq, former minister of agriculture
 Nawab Sir Khwaja Salimullah, first to propose the creation of the All India Muslim League
 M. A. Sattar, Minister of Jute and Textiles, 1985-1986, Minister of Labor and Manpower, 1986-1987, MP (Narayanganj-4), 1986-1990 and Chief Whip, 1988-1990
 Suranjit Sengupta, politician and minister
 Huseyn Shaheed Suhrawardy, Prime Minister of Pakistan, 1956–1957
 Begum Khaleda Zia, Prime Minister, 1991–1996; 2001–2006
 Sadhan Chandra Majumder, Minister of Food, BD
 Swapan Bhattacharjee, Minister of State for Local Government, Rural Development and Co-operatives
 Dhirendra Debnath Shambhu, MP (Barguna-1)
 Pankaj Nath, MP (Barisal-4)
 Jaya Sengupta, MP (Sunamganj)
 Biren Sikder, MP (Magura-2)
 Manoranjan Shill Gopal, MP (Dinajpur-1)

Photographers

 GMB Akash
 Shahidul Alam
 Manzoor Alam Beg
 Anwar Hossain
 Sarker Protick
 Munem Wasif

Heads of government

 Khondaker Mostaq Ahmad, President, August 15, 1975 – November 3, 1975
 Tajuddin Ahmed, (by Appointment and Oath) Prime Minister, 1971–1972
 Hussain Mohammed Ershad, by (India supported Military Coup) Chief Martial Law Administrator (CMLA) 1982–1985 and self declared President (1985–1990 December 6)
 Sheikh Hasina, (elected) Prime Minister, 1996–2001, 2009–13, 2013–present
 A. K. Fazlul Huq, presented the Lahore Resolution of 1940 that established Muslim League's demand for a homeland for Muslims, Pakistan. Prime Minister of Bengal, April 1937 to December 1941 and December 1941 to March 1943.
 Sheikh Mujibur Rahman, Chairman of the Awami League 1966–1974 and Prime Minister 1972~1974, Chairman of BAKSAL and President January 1975–August 15, 1975 
 Ziaur Rahman,  Chief Martial Law Administrator (CMLA) (under National State of Emergency) (November 7, 1975 – 1977); President, 1977–1981 (Assassinated May 30)
 Huseyn Shaheed Suhrawardy, Prime Minister of Bengal, April 1946 to August 1947; Prime Minister of Pakistan 1956–1957; founder of Awami League
 Begum Khaleda Zia, (elected) Prime Minister; 1991–1996, 1996–1996, 2001–2006

Intellectuals

Surendra Kumar Sinha, 21st Chief Justice of Bangladesh
 A.F.Salahuddin Ahmed, historian
 Muzaffar Ahmed, economist
 Syed Modasser Ali, ophthalmologist
 Munir Chowdhury, educationist
 Nikhilesh Dutta, Deputy Attorney General
 Kamal Hossain, lawyer and politician, civil rights activist
 Nasreen Pervin Huq, women's rights activist
 Roquia Sakhawat Hussain, prolific writer, feminist, social worker
 Muhammed Abdul Muid Khan, nominated as the Best Human Rights Lawyer of England and Wales in 2012
 M S Khan, librarian and pioneer of library science in Bangladesh
 Natyaguru Nurul Momen, pioneer cultural emancipator, playwright, essayist, translator, academician
 Anu Muhammad, economist
 Rehman Sobhan, economist
Mohammad Shahedul Anam Khan, defence analyst
Mirza Hussain Haider, former Justice of the Appellate Division of the Bangladesh Supreme Court
 Mohammad Yusuf Siddiq, historian, epigraphist, researcher, professor and author

Government officials and diplomats

 Shakil Ahmed, Army general
 Anwar Chowdhury, British High Commissioner to Dhaka, first non-White Briton to hold a senior diplomatic post
 Akbar Ali Khan, Bangladeshi economic historian and educationist who was a civil servant until 2001, Finance Ministry Adviser (Minister) of Caretaker government of Bangladesh
 A. H. M. Moniruzzaman, career diplomat belonging to the Bangladesh Foreign Service, was the head of Bangladesh Mission to the European Commission in Brussels, Belgium, Luxembourg and Switzerland
 Ayub Quadri, retired bureaucrat, adviser for the ministries of Education and Cultural Affairs to Caretaker government of Bangladesh
 Kamal Uddin Siddiqui, senior lecturer at the Monash University, a political economist and social scientist and a bureaucrat from Bangladesh
Quadrat Elahi Rahman Shafique, colonel in Bangladesh Army who died in the 2009 Bangladesh Rifles mutiny
Sarwar Hossain, Army General and former Military Secretary to the President of Bangladesh.

Noted diplomats and heads of major organizations 

 Abul Fateh, professional diplomat, first Foreign Secretary 1971–1972
 Chandra Kalindi Roy Henriksen, Chief Secretary of the United Nations Permanent Forum on Indigenous Issues
 M Sakhawat Hossain, former Election Commissioner of Bangladesh (2007–2012), Brigadier General (retd) Bangladesh Army, writer, author of more than 20 books, columnist, speaker, freelance commentator on national and international TV channels, security and defense analyst
 Irene Khan, former Secretary General of human rights organization Amnesty International; the first woman, the first Asian, and the first Muslim to hold the position; won the Sydney Peace Prize 2006
 Osman Ghani Khan, former Chairman of the United Nations Board of Auditors (1980–1982), former Comptroller and Auditor General of Bangladesh (1976–1082), and former Defense Secretary of Bangladesh

Religious personalities

 Fazlul Haque Amini (1945–2012), former principal of Jamia Qurania Arabia Lalbagh and politician
 Abul Kalam Azad (born 1947), preacher and Jamaat-e-Islami politician 
 Junaid Babunagari (born 1955), former Amir of Hefazat-e-Islam Bangladesh
 Muhibbullah Babunagari (born 1935), current Amir of Hefazat-e-Islam Bangladesh
 Abdul Halim Bukhari (born 1945), Islamic scholar and chancellor of Al Jamia Al Islamia Patiya
 Abdul Hamid Khan Bhashani (1880–1976), founder of the Awami Muslim League and The Daily Ittefaq
 Abdul Matin Chowdhury (1915–1990), Shaykh of Fulbari and political activist
 Abdul Haque Faridi (1903–1996), founder of the Islami Bishwakosh project
 Nurul Islam Farooqi (died 2014), TV presenter assassinated by Islamic militants
 Abdul Latif Chowdhury Fultali (1913–2008), founder of the Fultali movement and Darul Hadis Latifiah
 Muhammad Asadullah Al-Ghalib (born 1948), reformist and founder of Ahle Hadith Andolon Bangladesh
 Nur Uddin Gohorpuri (1924–2005), chairman of Befaqul Madarisil Arabia Bangladesh
 Mahmudul Hasan, President of Al-Haiatul Ulya Lil-Jamiatil Qawmia Bangladesh and Befaqul Madarisil Arabia Bangladesh, Chancellor of Jamia Islamia Darul Uloom Madania, Amir of Majlis-e-Dawatul Haq Bangladesh
 Ubaidul Haq (1928–2007), former khatib of Baitul Mukarram
 Azizul Haque (1919–2012), first translator of Sahih Al-Bukhari into the Bengali language
 Mamunul Haque (born 1973), Islamic scholar and influential speaker
 Mahfuzul Haque (born 1969), Islamic scholar and politician
 A F M Khalid Hossain (born 1959), vice-president of Hefazat-e-Islam Bangladesh
 Hafezzi Huzur (1895–1997), founder of the Bangladesh Khilafat Andolan
 Abu Hena Saiful Islam (born 1963), imam of the US Navy
 Izharul Islam, founder of Jamiatul Uloom Al-Islamia Lalkhan Bazar
 Saiful Islam (born 1974), founder of Bradford's Jamiah Khatamun Nabiyeen
 Shahidul Islam (born 1960), founder of al-Markaz al-Islami
 Sayyid Kamal ad-Din Jafri (born 1945), founder of the Bangladesh Islami University
 Abdul Jabbar Jahanabadi (1937–2016), former secretary-general of Befaqul Madarisil Arabia Bangladesh
 Nurul Islam Jihadi (born 1948), secretary-general of Hefazat-e-Islam Bangladesh
 Syed Rezaul Karim (born 1971), current Pir of Chormonai and leader of Islami Andolan Bangladesh
 Syed Fazlul Karim (1935–2006), former Pir of Chormonai and founder of Islami Andolan Bangladesh
 Nur Hossain Kasemi (1945–2020), former secretary-general of Hefazat-e-Islam Bangladesh
 Muhiuddin Khan (1935–2016), translator of the Qur'an and the Ma'ariful Qur'an exegesis
 Muhammad Abdul Malek (born 1969), muhaddith and author
 Ajmal Masroor (born 1971), British politician, imam and TV presenter
 Abdul Khaleque Mondal, Bangladesh Jamaat-e-Islami associate
 Sultan Zauq Nadvi (born 1939), founder of Jamia Darul Ma'arif Al-Islamia
 Abdur Rahim (1918–1987), inaugural Amir of the Bangladesh Jamaat-e-Islami
 Abdur Rahman (1920–2015), founder of Islamic Research Center Bangladesh
 Syed Mohammad Saifur Rahman Nizami (born 1916), Ekushey Padak recipient
 Abu Zafar Mohammad Saleh, Independence Award recipient
 Delwar Hossain Sayeedi (born 1940), Islamic scholar and Bangladesh Jamaat-e-Islami politician
 Shah Ahmad Shafi (1916-2020), former Amir of Hefazat-e-Islam Bangladesh
 Nurul Islam Walipuri (born 1955), mufassir, teacher and author
 Muhammad Waqqas (1952–2021), former secretary-general of Jamiat Ulema-e-Islam Bangladesh
 Obaidul Haque Wazirpuri (1934–2008), former co-president of Befaqul Madarisil Arabia Bangladesh

Criminals

Sports people

Cricket

Mashrafe Mortaza, one of the best pace bowler and most successful captain of Bangladesh
Shakib Al Hasan, one of the great all-rounder in this era, he ranked several times number 1 all-rounder in all three format of Cricket
Mohammad Ashraful, youngest player to hit a ton in Test Cricket
Tamim Iqbal, test, ODI and t20 batsman
Mahmudullah, top 10 T20I all rounders
Mushfiqur Rahim, wicketpeer batsman best team has produced
Mustafizur Rahman, Got man match on test and ODI debut
Taijul Islam, took hat trick on ODI debut and has recorded an eight wicket haul
Mehidy Hasan, Man Series debut
Nayeem Hasan, 5/61 test debut
 Nasum Ahmed, bowler
Soumya Sarkar, all rounder
Mominul Haque, test batsmen
Imrul Kayes, test and ODI batsman
Shafiul Islam, ODI and t20 bowler
Mohammad Saifuddin, all rounder
Mosaddek Hossain, all rounder
Rubel Hossain, fast bowler
Syed Rasel, fast bowler
Abdur Razzak, spin bowler
Liton Das, wicket keeper, batsman

Archery

 Emdadul Haque Milon, archer
 Md Ruman Shana

Chess

 Abdullah Al Rakib, Bangladeshi Grandmaster
 Reefat Bin-Sattar, Bangladeshi Grandmaster
 Rani Hamid, chess player; was awarded the FIDE Woman International Master (WIM) title in 1985 and won British Women's Championship (1983, 1985, 1989)
 Enamul Hossain, Bangladeshi Grandmaster
 Niaz Morshed, first Bangladeshi Grandmaster (as well as South Asia)
 Ziaur Rahman, Bangladeshi Grandmaster

Football

 Alfaz Ahmed, Sylheti footballer
 Ashraf Uddin Ahmed Chunnu, all-time leading goalscorer of the national team
 Shahed Ahmed, British footballer
 Toklis Ahmed
 Shahedul Alam Shahed, midfielder
 Shahidul Alam Sohel, goalkeeper
 Jahid Hasan Ameli
 Shahed Ahmed British footballer
 Sheikh Aslam, footballer; striker during the 1980s and 1990s
 Jamal Bhuyan, Danish footballer of Bangladeshi descent
 Hemanta Vincent Biswas, first Bangladeshi footballer to get a trial at a top European club; a Bangladeshi Christian
 Mithun Chowdhury
 Nasiruddin Chowdhury
 Hamza Choudhury, British footballer
 Kaiser Hamid, Sylheti, footballer, son of Rani Hamid (retired)
 Raihan Hasan
Topu Barman
 Aminul Hoque, goalkeeper
 Mohammed Monwar Hossain
 Mohamed Zahid Hossain
 Mamunul Islam
 Mohammed Ariful Islam (footballer)
 Monem Munna, first Bangladeshi captain to win a trophy with the national team
 Sayeed Hassan Kanan, goalkeeper
 Rezaul Karim
 Tariq Kazi, Finnish Bangladeshi footballer
 Mamun Khan
 Abdul Baten Mojumdar Komol
 Ashraf Mahmud Linkon
 Russel Mahmud Liton
 Atiqur Rahman Meshu
 Mohd Mamun Miah, Sylheti, footballer
 Sheikh Mohamed Mintu
 Nasirul Islam Nasir
 Shakhawat Hossain Rony
 Syed Rumman Bin Wali Sabbir
 Kazi Salahuddin, first Bangladeshi to play in a professional football league
 Saiful Bari Titu
 Anwar Uddin, British footballer
 Mohammad Ridoy

Golf

 Siddikur Rahman, Bangladeshi pro golfer who plays on the Asian Tour

Gymnastics

 Syque Caesar, artistic gymnast, member of the Michigan Wolverines
 Margarita Mamun, rhythmic gymnast, 2016 Gold medallist and Olympic champion in rhythmic gymnastics of Russian and Bangladeshi descent

Hockey

Mamunur Rahman Chayan
Asim Gope (GK)
Farhad Shetul
Khorshadur Rahman
Roman Sarkar
Rashel Mahmud
Fazla Rabby
Milon Hossain
Sobuj Shohanur
Sarower Hossain
Naim Uddin
Ashraful Islam
Arshad Hossain
Abu Nippon (GK)

Kabaddi

 Kazi Yunus Ahmed
 Razu Ahmed
 Hena Akhter
 Rupali Akhter
 Kazi Shahin Ara
 Farzana Akhter Baby
 Juni Chakma, of Chakma descent
 Mohammed Mozammal Haque
 Kamal Hossain
 Mosharrof Hossain
 Abul Kalam
 Shahnaz Parvin Maleka
 Badsha Miah, of Sylheti descent
 Kochi Rani Mondal
 Abu Salah Musa
 Ismat Ara Nishi
 Fatema Akhter Poly
 Md Mizanur Rahman
 Ziaur Rahman
 Bozlur Rashid
 Sharmin Sultana Rima
 Md Abdur Rouf
 Dolly Shefali

Martial arts

 Riaz Amin, youngest British WEKAF (World Eskrima/Kali/Arnis Federation) world champion, practises Shotokan Karate and Filipino Martial Arts
 Ruqsana Begum, first British woman in kickboxing to be Asian, Bangladeshi and Muslim, she practises Muay Thai
 Ali Jacko, British World Champion Lightweight Kickboxer, Black belt in Jujitsu, Wushu and Chinese Boxing
 Mak Yuree, founder of Butthan, Vajrapran and Combat Self-Defense, holds four world records
Sarbajit Chandra Sutradhar, WAKO Asian Kickboxing Championship 2nd Runner up, Lightweight Kickboxer, Black belt in  Kickboxing,  Shotokan Karate

Mountaineering

 Mohammad Khaled Hossain
 Musa Ibrahim
 Wasfia Nazreen, also social activist

Shooter

 Imam Hossain
 Asif Hossain Khan, gold and silver medalist in the Commonwealth Games
 Sharmin Ratna

Sprinter

 Mohamed Abu Abdullah, personal best 11.07
 Masbah Ahmmed, 100m sprinter
 Mohan Khan, personal best 11.25
 Beauty Nazmun Nahar, personal best 12.52

Swimming

 Brojen Das, swimmer, first Asian to swim across the English Channel and the first person to cross it four times

Table tennis

 Zobera Rahman Linu, table tennis player; 16 times national champion, Guinness World Record holder

See also
 List of Bangladeshi Americans
 List of Bengalis
 List of British Bangladeshis
 List of Bangladeshi architects
 List of Bangladeshi painters
 List of Bangladeshi poets
 List of Bangladesh-related topics
 List of Bangladesh Test cricketers
 List of Bangladeshi writers

References